Lule Bore is a song composed in 1946 by Albanian composer Simon Gjoni. Lule bore means Hortensia in English, but literally snowflower in Albanian.

History of the song
Simon Gjoni composed the piece in 1946 when Gjoni was a teacher at the high school in Shkodër. He fell in love with one of his students during a rare snowday in the city. That day he asked poet Zef Pali for a short text for a song to represent the girl as a snowflower in the text itself, and Pali prepared the poem that same day. Gjoni added the music to the words. Since when the song was first played its melody has been one of the most popular themes in the Albanian music and has been considered by critique and composer Çesk Zadeja as an unrepeatable model of the Albanian lyric. The song was an extraordinary success in a 1956 Moscow concert where the trio Avni Mula-Athanas-Ibrahim Tukiqi masterly interpreted it in front of a Russian public. The success repeated itself in a Youth Festival in 1961 in Vienna The song is very often sung by Albanian-American communities in their gatherings.

References

External links
 

Albanian-language songs
1946 songs